Swingbrow (sometimes written Swing Brow) is a hamlet near to Chatteris , Cambridgeshire lying alongside the Forty Foot Drain built by Vermuyden.  A Neolithic (4000 BC to 2201 BC) "perforated object" was discovered on the site, but the current buildings on the site are largely modern.

The hamlet formerly had a pub, the Ram Inn, which is now a residence, and a saddlery, now demolished. No official signs denote the hamlet because it is not safe to install these on the banks of the drain. The hamlet comprises two roads (droves); First Drove and Second Drove.

Hamlets in Cambridgeshire
Fenland District